On 17 March 2023, the International Criminal Court (ICC) issued arrest warrants for Vladimir Putin, the President of Russia, and Maria Lvova-Belova, Russian Commissioner for Children's Rights, alleging responsibility for the unlawful deportation and transfer of children during the Russian invasion of Ukraine. The warrant against Putin is the first against the leader of a permanent member of the United Nations Security Council.

Background

International Criminal Court 

The International Criminal Court (ICC) is an international court located in The Hague, Netherlands, created in 1998 by the Rome Statute. 

Both Russia and Ukraine signed the Statute, but neither ratified it and Russia withdrew its signature from the Statute in 2016 following a report that classified Russia's annexation of Crimea as an occupation; however, Ukraine accepted the Court's jurisdiction on its territory in 2014, allowing the Court to investigate alleged crimes committed during the Russo-Ukrainian war.

Russian invasion of Ukraine (2022–present) 

On 24 February 2022, Russia invaded and occupied parts of Ukraine in a major escalation of the Russo-Ukrainian War, which began in 2014. During the invasion, Russia has abducted thousands of Ukrainian children in occupied Ukrainian territory and has deported them to Russia.

Charges 
The charges are based on reasonable grounds that the two are responsible for "unlawful deportation and transfer of Ukrainian children from occupied areas of Ukraine to the Russian Federation, contrary to article 8(2)(a)(vii) and article 8(2)(b)(viii) of the Rome Statute".

Reactions
Kremlin spokesman Dmitry Peskov called the arrest warrant "outrageous and unacceptable", and said that Russia does not recognize the jurisdiction of the ICC. Lvova-Belova told Russian state media RIA Novosti: "It's great that the international community has appreciated the work to help the children of our country, that we take them out, that we create good conditions for them, that we surround them with loving, caring people."

Ukrainian foreign minister Dmytro Kuleba supported the ICC decision, tweeting: "International criminals will be held accountable for stealing children and other international crimes."

The New York Times stated that "the likelihood of a trial while Mr. Putin remains in power [appeared] slim" due to Russia's refusal to surrender their own officials and the court not trying defendants in absentia. Former US ambassador Stephen Rapp said the warrant "makes Putin a pariah. If he travels, he risks arrest. This never goes away."

References

2023 in Russia
2023 in international relations
2022 Russian invasion of Ukraine legal issues
International Criminal Court
Arrest warrant
Warrants